"Mauremys" glyphistoma is a hybrid turtle in the family Geoemydidae (formerly Bataguridae). Originally described as a new species supposedly endemic to Guangxi/China; it was classified as Data Deficient in the IUCN Red List.

It is known only from a few specimens including the type series, all from the pet trade supposedly from Guangxi or Vietnam. Either found in the wild or bred for the pet trade, it was later determined to be the offspring of a male Chinese stripe-necked turtle and a female Vietnamese pond turtle (Spinks et al. (2004), Stuart & Parham (2006)). If it is a wild-born hybrid, the specimen thus must have originated in central Vietnam, the only area where Mauremys annamensis is known to exist and overlaps with the range of Mauremys sinensis.

See also
 Mauremys iversoni the Fujian pond turtle
 Mauremys pritchardi
 Mauremys philippeni

References

 
 (2005): On the hybridisation between two distantly related Asian turtles (Testudines: Sacalia × Mauremys). Salamandra 41: 21–26. PDF fulltext
  (2001): New Chinese turtles: endangered or invalid? A reassessment of two species using mitochondrial DNA, allozyme electrophoresis and known-locality specimens. Animal Conservation 4(4): 357–367. HTML abstract Erratum: Animal Conservation 5(1): 86 HTML abstract

Mauremys
Taxonomy articles created by Polbot
Hybrid animals